Björn E. Lindblom (born June 19, 1934 in Stockholm) is a Swedish linguist and phonetician known for his contributions to empiricist phonology and phonetics (as opposed to chomskyan phonology). He teaches at Stockholm University and University of Texas at Austin. He is married to Ann-Mari Lindblom and has two children: Ann Lindblom, dietician, (born 1960) and John Lindblom, journalist, (born 1965).

Education
 Fil mag, Stockholm University, 1960, English, Romance lg's
 Fil lic, Uppsala University, 1963, Phonetics
 Fil dr (≈ Ph D), Lund University, 1968, Phonetics

Sources
 Lindblom's publications
 comments on Björn Lindblom's 'phonetic invariance and the adaptive nature of speech'
 Lindblom's works and publications
 Phonetics and the explanatory depth of phonological descriptions
 For Alvin M. Liberman
 Phonetica (Dedicated to Bjorn Lindblom on his 65th birthday)

Phoneticians
Academic staff of Stockholm University
University of Texas at Austin faculty
Living people
1934 births
Linguists from Sweden
Scientists from Stockholm
Phonologists
Lund University alumni
Stockholm University alumni
Uppsala University alumni